The Communities Directory, A Comprehensive Guide to Intentional Community provides listing of intentional communities primarily from North America but also from around the world. The Communities Directory has both an (online) and a print edition, which is published based on data from the website.

History
The first version of the Communities Directory appeared in issue #1 of Communities magazine in December 1972. In all, ten versions were published in the magazine over the next 18 years. The Fellowship for Intentional Community became publisher of the magazine in 1989, and in 1990 released the first self-contained book-format edition of the directory (also distributed to magazine subscribers, counted as double issue #77/78).

The Communities Directory is now in its 6th edition. Editions were published in 1990, 1995, 2000, 2005, and 2007. The production cycle has been shortened due to the online collection of data. The 4th edition lists 600 communities in North America and another 130 worldwide. The 5th edition lists almost 1250 communities worldwide.

There is also a companion video Visions of Utopia: Experiments in Sustainable Culture that outlines the history of intentional shared living and profiles a diverse cross-section of contemporary groups (external link included below).

The Online Communities Directory database is shared by members of the Intentional Community Data Collective which includes the Fellowship for Intentional Community and Coho/US's Cohousing Directory.

Publisher
The Communities Directory is published by Fellowship for Intentional Community, which also publishes the quarterly magazine Communities.

See also

 Cohousing
 Commune (intentional community)
 Diggers and Dreamers
 Ecovillage
 Fellowship for Intentional Community
 Intentional Community
 List of intentional communities

References

External links
Video: Visions of Utopia
Cohousing Directory
Intentional Communities Wiki
Intentional Communities Wiki page – on Communities Directory

Urban planning
Rural community development